Aquamicrobium aerolatum is a gram-negative, oxidase-positive, aerobic, rod-shaped, motile bacteria from the genus of Aquamicrobium which was isolated from air from a duck shed in Germany. Defluvibacter lusatiensis was transferred to Aquamicrobium aerolatum.

References

External links
Type strain of Aquamicrobium aerolatum at BacDive -  the Bacterial Diversity Metadatabase

Phyllobacteriaceae
Bacteria described in 2009